Eucyclotoma is a genus of sea snails, marine gastropod mollusks in the family Raphitomidae.

Species
Species within the genus Eucyclotoma include:
 Eucyclotoma albomacula Kay, 1979
 Eucyclotoma bicarinata (Pease, 1863)
 Eucyclotoma carinulata (Souverbie, 1875)
 Eucyclotoma cingulata (Dall, 1890)
 Eucyclotoma cymatodes (Hervier, 1897)
 Eucyclotoma exilis (Dunker, 1871)
 Eucyclotoma fusiformis (Garrett, 1873)
 Eucyclotoma hindsii (Reeve, 1843)
 Eucyclotoma inquinata (Reeve, 1845)
 Eucyclotoma lactea (Reeve, 1843)
 Eucyclotoma stegeri (McGinty, 1955)
 Eucyclotoma tricarinata (Kiener, 1840)
 Eucyclotoma trivaricosa (Martens, 1880)
 Eucyclotoma varicifera (Pease, 1868)
Species brought into synonymy
 Eucyclotoma minuta Reeve, 1844 : synonym of Nepotilla minuta (Tenison-Woods, 1877)
 Eucyclotoma molleri (Reeve, 1846): synonym of Eucyclotoma lactea (Reeve, 1843)
 Eucyclotoma nobilis Hedley, 1922: synonym of Eucyclotoma tricarinata (Kiener, 1840)
 Eucyclotoma pulcherrima Adams, 1871 : synonym of Eucyclotoma exilis (Dunker, 1871)
 Eucyclotoma ticaonica Reeve, 1845: synonym of Daphnella ticaonica (Reeve, 1845)
 Eucyclotoma tricarinata Reeve, 1843 : synonym of Eucyclotoma exilis (Dunker, 1871)

References

  Boettger, O. 1895. Die marinen Mollusken der Philippinen. IV. Die Pleurotomiden. Nachrichtsblatt der Deutschen Malakozooligischen Gesellschaft 27(1-2, 3-4): 1-20, 41-63 
 Powell, A.W.B. 1966. The molluscan families Speightiidae and Turridae, an evaluation of the valid taxa, both Recent and fossil, with list of characteristic species. Bulletin of the Auckland Institute and Museum. Auckland, New Zealand 5: 1–184, pls 1–23

External links
 Worldwide Mollusc Species Data Base: Raphitomidae
  Bouchet, P.; Kantor, Y. I.; Sysoev, A.; Puillandre, N. (2011). A new operational classification of the Conoidea (Gastropoda). Journal of Molluscan Studies. 77(3): 273-308

 
Raphitomidae
Gastropod genera